Allan Hopper may refer to:

 Alan Hopper, English footballer
Allan Hopper, character in 2 Days in the Valley